Patrick Washington (born March 4, 1978) is a former professional American football fullback in the National Football League (NFL). He played two seasons with the Jacksonville Jaguars.

Professional career
The Jaguars signed Washington, an undrafted rookie, prior to the 2001 NFL season because they did not have the salary cap space to pay the veteran minimum salary for a fullback.

In the 2001 and 2002 seasons, Washington played in a total of 30 games, starting in nine of them. He had no carries, but he had six catches for 41 yards. He also had 35 kick return yards and 17 total tackles.

References

1978 births
Living people
Jacksonville Jaguars players
Virginia Cavaliers football players